Major-General Frederick Joseph Plaskett CB MBE (23 October 1926 – 1 September 2018) was a British soldier who was later chief executive of the British Road Haulage Association until 1988 and colonel commandant of the Royal Corps of Transport from 1981 to 1991.

References 

1926 births
2018 deaths
British chief executives
People from Wallasey
Companions of the Order of the Bath
Members of the Order of the British Empire
British military personnel of the Malayan Emergency
Green Howards officers
British military personnel of the Korean War
English memoirists
Royal Corps of Transport officers
Place of birth missing
Place of death missing
Military personnel from Merseyside